The Student Association or SA is the official university recognized governance body for the students of the University of Wisconsin–Milwaukee. The SA is organized in accordance with Wis. Stats. § 36.09(5) to advocate on students' behalf; coordinate policy regarding student life, services, and interests at the University of Wisconsin–Milwaukee; and allocate a portion of Segregated University Fees. (SA Const. Article XII).

Mission
"... to enrich the student experience at UWM, through representation, advocacy, and the funding of services and activities that improve student life." (SA Const. Preamble).

References

External links
 Student Association Homepage
 Student Association Public Records and Governing Documents

University of Wisconsin–Milwaukee
Student governments in the United States